"Meadowlawn", also known as the '"Hagood House", is an antebellum plantation house, built in the Greek revival style, in Lowndsboro, Alabama, United States.  It is a contributing property to the Lowndesboro Historic District, which was added to the National Register of Historic Places on December 12, 1973.

History
The plantation of Meadowlawn was built in 1853 for Squire George Thomas (1797-1867).  The house was later sold to Fort Williamson.  In 1905 the home was sold to Ransom Meadows, born June 18, 1846, died February 2, 1940.  He was the last surviving Confederate veteran in Lowndes County.  His daughter, Aline Meadows, born February 16, 1880, died February 16, 1979, married Robert Bragg Hagood on April 3, 1907, in Lowndes County, Alabama.  It is to this couple that Ransom Meadows deeded the house.  To honor her father, Mrs. Hagood renamed the house "Meadowlawn."  She lived in the house until her death at age 99.  The house still remains in the Hagood family today.

Description
It is a two-story frame, with fluted Doric columns on two sides, 13 in all, and balconies over both main entrance doors with wrought iron railings.  Dicksonia Plantation, located nearby, was very similar in appearance, prior to its destruction by fire in 1939 and again in 1964.

Gallery

References

External links

Houses in Lowndes County, Alabama
Plantation houses in Alabama
Greek Revival houses in Alabama
Houses completed in 1853
Houses on the National Register of Historic Places in Alabama
National Register of Historic Places in Lowndes County, Alabama
Historic district contributing properties in Alabama